An outlying landing field (OLF) is an auxiliary airfield, associated with a seaborne component of the United States military. When associated with the United States Navy (who operate the majority), they are known as naval outlying landing fields (NOLFs) or naval auxiliary landing fields (NALFs); when associated with United States Marine Corps, they are known as Marine Corps outlying fields (MCOFs) or Marine Corps auxiliary landing fields (MCALFs).

Having no based units or aircraft, and minimal facilities, an outlying landing field is used as a low-traffic location for flight training, without the risks and distractions of other traffic at a naval air station or other airport.

List of active OLFs

NOLFs

NALFs

MCALFS & MCOFs

See also
Naval Outlying Landing Field North Carolina (proposed)

External links

Source: AirNav.com airport search

 
Airports by type